Sascha Henrix (born 22 March 1973) is a German former professional road cyclist.

Major results

1995
 3rd Rund um Düren
1997
 1st Stage 6 Rheinland-Pfalz Rundfahrt
 4th Luk-Cup Bühl
 6th HEW Cyclassics
 9th Rund um Köln
1998
 1st Stage 1 Hessen Rundfahrt
 1st Stage 5 Rheinland-Pfalz Rundfahrt
 1st Stage 4 Sachsen Tour
 4th Road race, National Road Championships
 4th Rund um Düren
1999
 8th Rund um Düren
 10th Overall Regio-Tour
 10th Rund um den Henninger Turm
2001
 10th Overall Niedersachsen-Rundfahrt
 10th Rund um den Henninger Turm

References

External links

1973 births
Living people
German male cyclists
People from Düren
Sportspeople from Cologne (region)
Cyclists from North Rhine-Westphalia